Amyloid beta A4 precursor protein-binding family B member 1 is a protein that in humans is encoded by the APBB1 gene.

Function 

The protein encoded by this gene is a member of the Fe65 protein family. It is an adaptor protein localized in the nucleus. It interacts with the Alzheimer's disease amyloid precursor protein (APP), transcription factor CP2/LSF/LBP1 and the low-density lipoprotein receptor-related protein. APP functions as a cytosolic anchoring site that can prevent the gene product's nuclear translocation. This encoded protein could play an important role in the pathogenesis of Alzheimer's disease. It is thought to regulate transcription. Also it is observed to block cell cycle progression by downregulating thymidylate synthase expression. Multiple alternatively spliced transcript variants have been described for this gene but some of their full length sequence is not known.

Interactions 

APBB1 has been shown to interact with APLP2, TFCP2, LRP1 and Amyloid precursor protein.

References

External links

Further reading 

 
 
 
 
 
 
 
 
 
 
 
 
 
 
 
 
 

Proteins